The 2012–13 LNBP was the 13th season of the Liga Nacional de Baloncesto Profesional, one of the professional basketball leagues of Mexico. It started on September 4, 2012 and ended on February 27, 2013. The league title was won by Toros de Nuevo Laredo, which defeated Halcones UV Xalapa in the championship series, 4–2.

Format 
16 teams participate. All the teams played against each other and the standings included all 16 teams with no separation in groups. The first 12 teams qualify for the playoffs. The group playoffs have a first round (best-of-5), a second round (best-of-5), semifinals (best-of-7) and finals (best-of-7).

Teams

Regular season

Standings 

Note: the LNBP gave 70 points to Soles, 51 to Lechugueros, 46 to Guerreros and 44 to Osos.

Playoffs

Preliminary round 
The team seed is indicated after the team name. The first 4 teams in the standings are automatically qualified for the quarterfinals.

Abejas de Guanajuato (9) defeat Huracanes de Tampico (8), 3–1
Panteras de Aguascalientes (5) defeat Lechugueros de León (12), 3–0
Pioneros de Quintana Roo (6) defeat Correcaminos UAT Victoria (11), 3–0
Fuerza Regia de Monterrey (7) defeat Barreteros de Zacatecas (10), 3–0

Playoffs

References

External links 
2012–13 LNBP season on Latinbasket.com

LNBP seasons
2012 in Mexican sports
2013 in Mexican sports
2012–13 in North American basketball